Listed below are books that describe the techniques of various partner dances.

Ballroom dancing

Basic books for the International Style
Alex Moore:
The Ballroom Technique
Ballroom Dancing, an elaboration on the above book (9th Edition, 1986)
Popular Variations (numerous reprints and editions since 1954)
Victor Silvester, Modern Ballroom Dancing. Stanley Paul, London (first published 1928, 1993 edition , current edition 2005)
 Imperial Society of Teachers of Dancing (ISTD):
The Ballroom Technique, (numerous reprints and editions since 1948) originally based on a work of the same name by Alex Moore.
The Revised Technique of Latin-American Dancing, (reprints and editions since 1971)
Popular Variations in Latin-American Dancing, (1982)
Guy Howard, Technique of Ballroom Dancing
Walter Laird:
Technique of Latin Dancing
Technique of Latin Dancing Supplement
Craig Revel Horwood,  Ballroom Dancing, Teach Yourself (2010)

Advanced books for the International Style
Christopher R. Willis (FISTD):
Leading Competition Figures: Waltz and Foxtrot, ; 
Leading Competition Figures: Tango and Quickstep, ;  
Competition Figures: Charts and Footpatterns, ;

Basic books for the American Style
Richard M. Stephenson and Joseph Iaccarino, Complete Book of Ballroom Dancing (1992) Main Street Books, 
Jeffrey Allen, The Complete Idiot's Guide to Ballroom Dancing, 2nd edition 2006,

Partner and Social Dance Research and Scholarship
 Juliet E. McMains (2006) Glamour Addiction: Inside the American Ballroom Dance Industry Wesleyan University Press, 
The first in-depth study of the American DanceSport.
Kristine M. McCusker, Diane Pecknold (2004) A Boy Named Sue: Gender and Country Music,  University Press of Mississippi, 
About roles gender plays in creating and marketing the Country /Western musical and dance forms.

Partner and Social Dance Teaching
This list contains books that provide guidance for how to teach partner/social dancing. It does not include books, such as The Dancing Master, that primarily focus on the dance steps or technique, rather than on how to teach.

 Edith Ballwebber, 1938, Group Instruction in Social Dancing, A. S. Barnes & Company, Inc
 Dorothy Norman Cropper, 1939, Teacher's Manual of Ballroom Dancing, IHRA Publishing Co.
 August Harris & Donnabel Keys, 1940, Teaching Social Dance, Prentice-Hall, Inc
 Alma Heaton, 1965, Techniques of Teaching Ballroom Dance, Brigham Young University
 Judy Patterson Wright, 1996, Social Dance Instruction, Human Kinetics Publishers, 
 Diane Jarmalow, 2011, Teach Like a Pro, Ballroom Dance Teachers College, 
 Rudi Trautz, 2021, The Art of Teaching Social Dancing,

General
Patrice Tanaka, Becoming Ginger Rogers: How Ballroom Dancing Made Me A Happier Woman, Better Partner, and Smarter CEO''', BenBella Books (2011) 
Matt Barber, Beginning Ballroom: Why's, Do's, Don'ts, and Shoes''. (2011).

Other lists

 The US Library of Congress has a collection of 250+ dance manuals, from 1490 to 1920, with full scans.
 Library of Dance has a curated list 6000+ of dance books, from the 15th century to today, many of which are partner dance books. 2000+ are downloadable.

References

External links
Wikibooks:Swing Dancing, for Swing dance

Lists of books
Dance-related lists